State Route 307 (SR 307) is a north–south state highway in McMinn and Monroe counties of East Tennessee.

Route description

SR 307 begins in McMinn County in downtown Athens at an intersection with SR 30 and SR 39. It goes northeast along East Madison Avenue before following Eastanallee Avenue to pass through neighborhoods. SR 307 then merges back onto East Madison Avenue to cross a bridge over a creek and pass the headquarters of Mayfield Dairy. The highway continues northeast through neighborhoods before leaving Athens and passes through farmland as Old Athens Madisonville Road. It then crosses into Monroe County as Eastanaula Road and continues northeast through farmland and rural areas before coming to an end at an intersection with SR 68 between Sweetwater and Madisonville, approximately half a mile west of The Lost Sea.

Major intersections

References

307
Transportation in McMinn County, Tennessee
Transportation in Monroe County, Tennessee